Republika Srpska national under-21 football team is a youth team of Republika Srpska that represents the Bosnian entity in friendly matches and is controlled by the Football Association of Republika Srpska.

See also
Republika Srpska official football team
Republika Srpska official under-23 football team

Football in Republika Srpska